Treaty of London (1871) was an international treaty signed on 13 March 1871 by Germany, Austria, the Ottoman Empire, the United Kingdom, France, Russia, and Italy.

Foreign Minister of the Russian Empire Alexander Gorchakov on 31 October 1870 denounced the Black Sea clauses of the Treaty of Paris (1856). It violated article XIV of the Treaty, which stated It cannot be either annulled or modified without the assent of the Powers signing the present Treaty.

In the London Protocol of 17 January 1871, it was said that the representatives of Germany, Austro-Hungary, Great Britain, Italy, Russia and Turkey, having met in a conference, recognized as a essential principle of the law of nations that no power can liberate itself from the engagements of a treaty, nor modify the stipulations thereof, except as the result of the consent of the contracting parties, by means of an amicable understanding.

Treaty signed 13 March 1871:

Art. I. Articles XI, XIII, and XIV of the Treaty of Paris of March 30, 1856, as well as the special Convention concluded between Russia and the Sublime Porte, and annexed to the said Article XIV, are abrogated, and replaced by the following Article.

Art. II. The principle of the closing of the Straits of the Dardanelles and the Bosphorus, such as it has been established by the separate Convention of March 30, 1856[132] is maintained, with power to His Imperial Majesty the Sultan to open the said Straits in time of peace to the vessels of war of friendly and allied Powers, in case the Sublime Porte should judge it necessary in order to secure the execution of the stipulations of the Treaty of Paris of March 30, 1856.

Treaty of Berlin (1878):

Art. LXIII. The Treaty of Paris of March 30, 1856, as well as the Treaty of London of March 13, 1871, are maintained in all such of their provisions as are not abrogated or modified by the preceding stipulation.

References

1871 treaties
Treaties of the Russian Empire
Treaties of the Kingdom of Italy (1861–1946)
Treaties of the Kingdom of Prussia
Treaties of the United Kingdom (1801–1922)
Treaties of Austria-Hungary
Treaties of the Ottoman Empire
Treaties of the French Third Republic